NGC 300 (also known as Caldwell 70) is a spiral galaxy in the constellation Sculptor. It is one of the closest galaxies to the Local Group, and probably lies between the latter and the Sculptor Group.  It is the brightest of the five main spirals in the direction of the Sculptor Group. It is inclined at an angle of 42° when viewed from Earth and shares many characteristics of the Triangulum Galaxy. It is 94,000 light-years in diameter, somewhat smaller than the Milky Way, and has an estimated mass of (2.9 ± 0.2) × 1010 .

Nearby galaxies and group information
NGC 300 and the irregular galaxy NGC 55 have traditionally been identified as members of the Sculptor Group, a nearby group of galaxies in the constellation of the same name.  However, recent distance measurements indicate that these two galaxies actually lie in the foreground. It is likely that NGC 300 and NGC 55 form a gravitationally bound pair.

Distance estimates
In 1986, Allan Sandage estimated the distance to NGC 300 to be 5.41 Mly (1.66 Mpc). By 1992, this had been updated to 6.9 Mly (2.1 Mpc) by Freedman et al. In 2006, this was revised by Karachentsev et al. to be . At about the same time, the tip of the red giant branch (TRGB) method was used to produce an estimate of  using edge detection and  using maximum likelihood.

NGC 300-OT
On a CCD image obtained on May 14, 2008, amateur astronomer L.A.G. Berto Monard discovered a bright optical transient (OT) in NGC 300 that is designated NGC 300-OT. It is located at RA:  and DEC:  in a spiral arm containing active star formation. Its broad-band magnitude was 14.3 in that image.  An earlier image (from April 24, 2008), taken just after NGC 300 reemerged from behind the Sun, evidenced an already brightening OT at ~16.3 magnitude. No brightening was detected on a February 8, 2008 image or on any earlier ones. The transient's peak measured magnitude was 14.69 on May 15, 2008.

Additionally, the photometric and spectroscopic properties of the OT imply that it is not a luminous blue variable either. Since its peak, brightness dropped smoothly through September 2008 while becoming continuously redder. After September 2008, brightness continued to fall at a lower rate in the optical spectrum but with strong Hα emissions. Further, the optical spectrum is mostly made up of fairly narrow Hydrogen Balmer and Ca II emission lines coupled with strong Ca II H&K absorption. Research into historical Hubble images provide an accurate upper bound on the progenitor star's brightness. This suggested a low-mass main sequence star as progenitor with the transient resulting from a stellar merger similar to red Galactic nova V838 Monocerotis. Analysis of historical images of the area of the OT suggest with 70% certainty that the progenitor formed in a burst of stars around 8–13 Myr ago and implies the progenitor's mass to be 12–25 M⊙ assuming the OT is due to an evolving massive star.

However, in 2008 a bright mid-infrared progenitor to the transient was discovered in historical Spitzer data. This demonstrated that the transient was associated with an energetic explosion of a low-mass ≈ 10 M⊙ star. The transient's low luminosity as compared to typical core-collapse supernova, combined with its spectral attributes and dust covered properties, make it nearly identical to NGG 6946's SN 2008S.

The spectrum of NGC 300-OT observed with Spitzer shows strong, broad emission features at 8 μm and 12 μm.  Such features are also seen in Galactic carbon-rich protoplanetary nebulae.

SN 2010da
On May 23, 2010, Monard discovered another transient object of 16th magnitude, denoted as SN 2010da.  The optical transient was detected 15".9 west and 16".8 north the center of the galaxy at coordinates 00 55 04.86 −37 41 43.7.

Two sets of independent follow-up spectroscopy data suggested that this was again another optical transient rather than a supernova, possibly an outbursting luminous blue variable star according to one spectrum, as earlier predicted from the nature of the candidate mid-infrared progenitor.  The transient faded by 0.5–0.7 mag in 9 days, much faster than the 2008 transient in NGC 300.

Binary black hole system
The x-ray source at the core of NGC 300 is designated NGC 300 X-1.  Astronomers speculate that NGC 300 X-1 is a new kind of Wolf-Rayet black hole binary system similar to the confirmed such system IC 10 X-1. Their shared properties include an orbital period of 30 hours.

WO star 
There is an oxygen-sequence Wolf-Rayet star (WO4 type), known as STWR 13, located in one of the bright H II regions in NGC 300.

Notes

Average = ((1.845 + 1.86) / 2) ± ((0.1252 + 0.072)0.5 / 2) = 1.86 ± 0.07

References

External links

Confirmation image of SN 2010da (2010-05-24) / Wikisky DSS2 zoom-in of same region

Unbarred spiral galaxies
Sculptor (constellation)
0300
03238
070b
18260805
Articles containing video clips
Virgo Supercluster